Judy Malcolm (December 1, 1910July 22, 1998) was an American film actress. Born Marguerite Westergren, Malcolm appeared in approximately 25 films between 1933 and 1951. Malcolm is familiar to modern viewers for her roles in several Three Stooges short subjects such as G.I. Wanna Home, No Dough Boys, and especially Micro-Phonies (as the radio-station receptionist). She was also a stunt double for Fay Wray in the original King Kong, notably performing the jump from the cliff into the river.

Judy Malcolm had been a dancer and comedienne in vaudeville and burlesque. Her partner in burlesque acts was rubber-faced comedian Gus Schilling. One of their standard bits would have Schilling standing on stage and Malcolm appearing out of nowhere and slapping him across the face, shouting, "How dare you look like somebody I hate!" In 1943 Malcolm went to work as a contract player in short subjects for Columbia Pictures. It is likely that Malcolm brought Gus Schilling to producer Jules White's attention, because White soon teamed Schilling with character comedian Richard Lane for their own comedy series. Judy Malcolm appears in most of the Schilling & Lane comedies, and the "somebody I hate" punchline became a running gag. She retired from motion pictures in 1951.

Malcolm died on July 22, 1998.

Selected filmography
 Heavenly Daze (1948)
 G.I. Wanna Home (1946)
 Micro-Phonies  (1945)
 If a Body Meets a Body (1945) - Link family member (uncredited) 
 No Dough Boys (1944)
 Gents Without Cents (1944)
 Crash Goes the Hash (1944)
 King Kong (1933)

References

External links

1910 births
1998 deaths
American film actresses
20th-century American actresses
20th-century American comedians
Actresses from Buffalo, New York